Joël Pascal Schmied (born 23 September 1998) is a Swiss footballer who plays for FC Sion.

References

Living people
1998 births
Swiss men's footballers
Association football defenders
BSC Young Boys players
FC Rapperswil-Jona players
FC Wil players
FC Vaduz players
Swiss expatriate footballers
Swiss expatriate sportspeople in Liechtenstein
Expatriate footballers in Liechtenstein
FC Sion players
Swiss Super League players
Swiss Challenge League players
Swiss Promotion League players
Footballers from Bern